Nationality words link to articles with information on the nation's poetry or literature (for instance, Irish or France).

Events
1361:
Guillaume de Machaut writes the Dit de la fontaine amoureuse
1365:
 November 30 – The Nagarakretagama, a Javanese eulogy chronicling the journey of the Majapahit king, Hayam Wuruk, through his kingdom, is completed by Mpu Prapanca
Guillaume de Machaut completes Le voir dit
c.1367:
 Earliest likely date for the writing of Piers Plowman in Middle English, presumably by William Langland; it includes the earliest known reference to "rhymes of Robin Hood"
c.1368:
 Petrarch concludes writing the sequence of Italian sonnets and other poems known as Il Canzoniere

Births
Death years link to the corresponding "[year] in poetry" article. There are conflicting or unreliable sources for the birth years of many people born in this period; where sources conflict, the poet is listed again and the conflict is noted:

1360:
 Jean Petit (died 1411), French theologian, poet and professor

1363:
 Christine de Pizan (died 1434), Italian poet writing courtly poetry in French

1368:
 Thomas Hoccleve (died 1426), English poet

1369:
 Imadaddin Nasimi (died 1417), Turkic Ḥurūfī and mystical poet

Deaths
Birth years link to the corresponding "[year] in poetry" article:

1361:
 Philippe de Vitry (born 1291), French composer, music theorist and poet

1365:
 Zhu Derun (born 1294), Chinese painter and poet in Yuan Dynasty

1367:
 Jakushitsu Genkō (born 1290), Japanese Rinzai master, poet, flute player, and first abbot of Eigen-ji

See also

 Poetry
 14th century in poetry
 14th century in literature
 List of years in poetry
 Grands Rhétoriqueurs
 French Renaissance literature
 Renaissance literature
 Spanish Renaissance literature

Other events:
 Other events of the 14th century
 Other events of the 15th century

15th century:
 15th century in poetry
 15th century in literature

Notes

14th-century poetry
Poetry